Summer Rains is the third studio album from the folk/swing band The Ditty Bops released in 2008. The album was nominated for a Grammy in the category Best Recording Package.

Track listing
 "Summer Rains" – 3:20
 "When's She Comin' Home" – 2:56
 "Skinny Bones" – 3:11
 "What Happened to the Radio" – 2:42
 "The Next Best Thing" – 2:34
 "Because We Do" – 2:38
 "Interlude for Ten Strings" – 2:05
 "I Stole Your Wishes" – 2:39
 "All Over You" – 2:50
 "Feel From The Outside In" – 3:01
 "The Weeds Are Winning" – 3:20
 "Sugar and Spice" – 3:49

Personnel
Abby DeWald - vocals, acoustic guitar, piano track 8, charango track 5
Amanda Barrett - vocals, mandolin, ukulele, steel drum
David Boucher - baritone sax
Mitchell Froom - keyboards
Jesca Hoop - vocals track 3, 4, 10
John Lambdin - lap steel, violin, guitar track 9
Kaveh Rastegar - bass
Greg Rutledge - piano, whistle
Pete Thomas - drums, percussion

2008 albums
The Ditty Bops albums